Philotermes is a genus of rove beetles in the family Staphylinidae. There are about seven described species in Philotermes.

Species
These seven species belong to the genus Philotermes:
 Philotermes cubitopilis Seevers, 1957
 Philotermes emersoni Seevers, 1938
 Philotermes fuchsii Kraatz, 1857
 Philotermes laxicornis Sharp, 1883
 Philotermes pennsylvanicus Kraatz, 1857
 Philotermes pilosus Kraatz, 1857
 Philotermes werneri Seevers, 1957

References

Further reading

 
 
 

Aleocharinae
Articles created by Qbugbot